Warship is a long-running yearly publication covering the design, development, and service history of combat ships. It is published by Conway Publishing in the United Kingdom and the United States Naval Institute Press in North America.

History 
Warship began as a quarterly magazine, which, according to The Dreadnought Project, published "historical and technical essays of incredible value and merit to students of fighting ships". The first issue, edited by Antony Preston, was published in January 1977; featured articles included "Washington's Cherrytrees: The Evolution of the British 1921–22 Capital Ships", by N.J.M. Campbell, and "British Destroyer Appearance in World War II: Fleet Destroyers 1939–42", by Alan Raven. The journal became an annual in 1989, under the editorship of Robert Gardiner. Under this new format, The Dreadnought Project notes, "it remains the "periodical" that deserves a space on your reference bookshelf long after it has been read the first time."

Current status 
Since 2004, Warship is edited by John Jordan. Each annual issue comprises articles by retired naval officers, marine architects, and maritime experts spanning the globe. In 2003, Sea Power wrote "This first-class compendium of articles on the world’s warships has something of interest for virtually every reader". In 2009 Conway Publishing set up a website to support the magazine, featuring a gallery, a content index, articles from past editions, and ship plans.

Index of issues 
A comprehensive index of past issues and their articles can be found in the online Warship archive or at The Dreadnought Project.

Editorial history 
The following persons have been editor-in-chief of the magazine:
 John Jordan: Warship 2005–2012
 Antony Preston: Warship 1999–2004
 David McLean and Antony Preston: Warship 1996–1998
 John Roberts: Warship 1994–1995
 Robert Gardiner: Warship 1989–1993
 Ian Grant: Volume XII
 Andrew Lambert: Volumes IX–XI
 Randal Gray: Volume VIII
 John Roberts: Volumes III–VII
 Antony Preston: Volumes I & II

Notable contributors 
Notable contributors include:
 Andrew Lambert
 Vincent P. O'Hara

References

External links 
 

Military magazines published in the United States
Magazines established in 1977
History magazines published in the United States
Maritime history magazines
Quarterly magazines published in the United States
Quarterly magazines published in the United Kingdom
Magazines published in London
History magazines published in the United Kingdom
Magazines published in Maryland